Matthew Cooperman is an American poet, critic and editor. He is the author of five full-length collections of poems, most recently Spool, winner of the New Measure Prize (Free Verse Editions/Parlor Press, 2016),  Imago for the Fallen World (w/Marius Lehene, Jaded Ibis, 2013) and Still: of the Earth as the Ark which Does Not Move (Counterpath Press). Cooperman's first book, A Sacrificial Zinc, won the Lena Miles Wever-Todd Prize from Pleiades in 2001.

Biography
Cooperman was born in 1964 in New Haven, Connecticut, but grew up in the Bay Area of California.
He attended Colgate University, the University of Colorado and Ohio University, where he earned a PhD in English Literature and Language. Cooperman has taught at the University of Colorado, Ohio University, Harvard University, Denver University and Cornell College.
He is currently Professor of English at Colorado
State University. He lives in Fort Collins, with the poet Aby Kaupang, and their two children.

Publications

Poetry
His poems have appeared widely in literary journals, including 1913, American Letters & Commentary, Boston Review, CHAIN, Chicago Review, Denver Quarterly, ecopoetics, Hotel Amerika,
Interim, International Quarterly, New American Writing, Parthenon West, Pleiades, Quarterly West, Sentence, Verse and VOLT, among others, and in anthologies including Ecopoetry, The Sentence Book of
Prose Poetry, and The Next of Us is Yet to Be Born (Kent State).

Journals
Cooperman's criticism and interviews have also appeared in such journals as Angelaki: A Journal of Theoretical Humanities, Salt, ecopoetics, Chicago Review, jubilat, The Writers' Chronicle, The
Iowa Review, Interdisciplinary Studies in Literature and the Humanities, American Studies International
and the American Book Review.

Editing
Cooperman has been involved in editing for the publications Rolling Stock, Tattered Fetlock, Sphere, Shankpainter, and Colorado Review, and was a founding editor of the exploratory prose journal Quarter After Eight. He is currently co-poetry editor for Colorado Review.

Other projects
Cooperman has worked with such groups and persons as Sharon Butcher Dance, Marisol Eckert Collective, artist Lisa Cooperman, Italian artist Simonetta Moro, Canadian composer Libby Larsen, and British poet Lawrence Upton.
In 2004 he co-founded the collective Accidental Vestments with the Romanian artist Marius Lehene. Since that time he and Lehene have been active on a number of projects, including the image and textbook Imago for the Fallen World. With the poet Aby Kaupang, Cooperman has authored a number of works, most notably the ongoing projects NOS (disorder, not otherwise specified) and Jungle Book: A Memoir of Abilities. The two often perform together.

Awards
Includes a Residency Fellowship at the Fine Arts Work Center in Provincetown, the New Measure Prize from Free Verse Editions, the E. Marvin Lewis Award from WeberStudies, the Pavement Saw Chapbook Prize, the Wick Chapbook Prize from Kent State, the Billie Murray Denny Poetry Prize, the Jovanovich Prize from the University of Colorado, and five Pushcart nominations. He currently teaches at Colorado State University, and is a poetry editor for Colorado Review.

Works
Surge (Kent State University Press, 1998)

A Sacrificial Zinc (Pleiades/LSU, 2001)

Words About James (phylum press, 2005)

DaZE (Salt Publishing, Ltd, 2006)

Still: (to be) Perpetual (Dove|Tail Poetry, 2007)

Still: of the Earth as the Ark which Does Not Move (Counterpath Press, 2011)

Imago for the Fallen World (Jaded Ibis, 2013)

Little Spool (Pavement Saw, 2015)

Disorder 299.00 (Essay Press, 2016)

Spool (Free Verse Editions/Parlor Press, 2016)

References

External links 

 Official website

1964 births
Living people
American male poets
21st-century American poets
21st-century American male writers